Royal Air Force Grangemouth or more simply RAF Grangemouth is a former Royal Air Force station located  north east of Falkirk, Stirlingshire, Scotland.

History
It was opened as the Central Scotland Airport in May 1939 and operated as a Civilian Air Navigation School (CANS) until early September 1939.  After the war it was used as Gliding School until 1946. It was then used by RAF Maintenance Command until its closure in June 1955.

Second World War

From September 1939 – March 1941 it was used by 602 Squadron flying Supermarine Spitfires, 141 Squadron flying Bristol Blenheims and Gloster Gladiators and 263 Squadron flying Westland Whirlwinds.  In December 1940 it was used by No. 58 Operational Training Unit (later renamed No. 2 Tactical Exercise Unit RAF).

The air traffic control tower (watch tower) was of a pre-war civilian type. There were 10 Hangars, two were of a civil type and the other eight were of the Blister type.

In an attempt to reduce the number of crashes caused by over-shooting, the east–west runway was extended by about 300 yards in the summer of 1942. This runway intersected with the Inchyra Road runway and extended west to where Candie Crescent now starts off Overton Road. The Charlotte Dundas Shopping Centre was built over part of the remains of this runway in 1960–1961.

Post war 

After the war, it was used as a gliding school and by No. 13 Refresher Flying School RAF, then by RAF Maintenance Command until closure in 1955.

Unfortunately at 0200 one Sunday in 1952 a fire started & some of the buildings were destroyed.

Timeline 

 01/05/1939: Opened as Central Scotland Airport.
 01/05/1939 – 09/39: No. 35 E&RFTS with Hawker Harts and de Havilland Tiger Moths and No. 10 Civilian Air Navigation School with Avro Ansons.
 09/39 – 03/41: Airfield used by 602 Sqn Spitfires, 141 Sqn Blenheims and Gladiators and 263 Sqn Hurricanes and 614 Sqn Lysanders.
 12/40 – 06/44: No. 58 Operational Training Unit with Spitfires, from 1942 satellite airfield at RAF Balado Bridge.
 10/43: No. 58 Operational Training Unit renamed No. 2 Tactical Exercise Unit.
 1945-46: Used as a Gliding School.
 1948-49: 13 Refresher Flying School with de Havilland Tiger Moths, then used by RAF Maintenance Command until closure.

Operational units and aircraft

Other Units/Wings 

 No. 52 (Army Co-operation) Wing RAF
9 June 1940 – 14 July 1940.

 No. 58 Operational Training Unit 
No. 58 Operational Training Unit was planned to form at RAF Grangemouth in October 1940 within No. 10 Group to train night fighter crews. This was changed in early December when it actually formed as a day fighter pilot training unit, using Spitfires and Masters. It was transferred to No. 81 Group at the end of December 1940 and disbanded in early October 1943 when it was redesignated No. 2 Combat Training Wing (changed again to No. 2 Tactical Exercise Unit at a later date).

In the event of a German invasion the OTU would have become No. 558 Squadron (and later also as No. 563 Squadron) to operate from RAF Turnhouse.

The unit reformed on 15 March 1945, at RAF Poulton in No. 12 Group, as half an Operational Training Unit equipped with Spitfires from the day fighter element of No. 41 Operational Training Unit until it was disbanded on 20 July 1945.

Codes used: -
PQ Dec 1940 – Oct 1943
P9 Mar 1945 – Jul 1945

 No. 4 Aircraft Delivery Flight RAF (April 1941 – January 1942)
Commanding Officer Squadron Leader Eric Valentine Hulbert appointed 16 April 1943.

 No. 2 Combat Training Wing RAF (October 1943)
See No. 58 Operational Training Unit Above.

 No. 2 Tactical Exercise Unit RAF (October 1943 – June 1944)
See No. 58 Operational Training Unit Above.

 Sub site of No. 14 Maintenance Unit RAF (October 1944 – August 1949)

Present day
Today the site is now part of Inchyra Park, a light industrial area, the Charlotte Dundas Shopping Centre, and a housing estate. The shorter runway is now Inchyra Road, Grangemouth. Contrary to many reports, the vast majority of the site is NOT now covered by petrochemicals industry. Only a relatively small area east of Inchyra Road has such industry on it and which was only built on during the 1970s and thereafter.

Some of the hangars still remain intact at Latitude, Longitude 56.013348N, 3.707562W.

In 2008, a memorial garden was unveiled, to commemorate those who died, planted on ground granted for the purpose and located on the perimeter of the original airfield.  Within the garden, a wall features the names of 71 trainee pilots from 11 countries who died whilst in training. On Thursday 9 May 2013, a full size replica of a Mk1 Spitfire was unveiled in the memorial garden.

The memorial remembers the contribution of hundreds of Polish and other international pilots who developed their skills at the airfield as members of No. 58 Operational Training Unit during the Second World War.

Wartime Deaths

The many British and Polish pilots dying of wounds on return are buried to the south in Grandsable Cemetery.

References

Citations

Bibliography

External links 
Control Towers Website: RAF Grangemouth
602 Squadron Museum Association: Website Index
History of Grangemouth Oil Refinery: BP Grangemouth History
RCAHMS Archaeological Notes: Photo & Data
Wallace Shackleton, 58 OTU Web Page: No. 58 OTU, Roll of Honour.

Royal Air Force stations in Scotland
Royal Air Force stations of World War II in the United Kingdom
Buildings and structures in Falkirk (council area)
Military airbases established in 1939
RAF